George H. Guernsey (December 10, 1839 – November 28, 1900) was an American architect from Montpelier, Vermont.

Life
Guernsey was born on December 10, 1839, in Calais, Vermont, to Gilman and Clotina (Southwick) Guernsey. He served in the Civil War, after which he relocated to Montpelier. After working as a builder, he established himself as an architect. He would go on to become the leading architect in Vermont.

In 1897, he was elected as Montpelier's third mayor. He died of tuberculosis at home in 1900. Guernsey was buried at Green Mount Cemetery in Montpelier.

Legacy
Many of Guernsey's buildings contribute to historic districts on the National Register of Historic Places, in addition to one individual structure. In 2013, a book called Vermont's Elusive Architect: George H. Guernsey was published by the Bethel Historical Society, where Guernsey had designed the town hall. The book found Guernsey to be one of the most influential 19th century architects in Vermont.

Architectural works
 1875 - French's Block, 32 Main St, Montpelier, Vermont
 1875 - Union Block, 26 State St, Montpelier, Vermont
 Burned in 1914.
 1878 - Universalist Church (former), 201 Bridge St, Richmond, Vermont
 1879 - Walton Block, 17 State St, Montpelier, Vermont
 1880 - George H. Guernsey House, 68 E State St, Montpelier, Vermont
 The architect's own residence.
 1883 - Blanchard Block, 73 Main St, Montpelier, Vermont
 1884 - St. Charles R. C. Church, 31 Cherry Hill St, Bellows Falls, Vermont
 1885 - Holy Angels R. C. Church, 246 Lake St, St. Albans, Vermont
 1886 - Notre Dame de Victoire R. C. Church, Main & Winter Sts, St. Johnsbury, Vermont
 Burned in 1966.
 1887 - Barton M. E. Church (former), Church St, Barton, Vermont
 1888 - Christ M. E. (St. John's) Church, 135 Main St, Lancaster, New Hampshire
 1888 - St. Francis de Sales R. C. Church, 238 Main St, Bennington, Vermont
 1889 - Edward Dewey House, 128 State St, Montpelier, Vermont
 1890 - John W. Burgess House (Redstone), 26 Terrace St, Montpelier, Vermont
 1891 - Bethel Town Hall, 134 S Main St, Bethel, Vermont
 1891 - Dodge Hall, Norwich University, Northfield, Vermont
 Demolished.
 1891 - Immaculate Heart of Mary R. C. Church, 18 Lincoln Ave, Rutland, Vermont
 1891 - United Baptist Church, 23 Park St, Lakeport, New Hampshire
 1891 - St. Thomas R. C. Church, 6 Green St, Underhill, Vermont
 1892 - Ludlow Baptist Church, 99 Main St, Ludlow, Vermont
 1892 - St. Augustine R. C. Church, 16 Barre St, Montpelier, Vermont
 1892 - Whiting Library, 117 Main St, Chester, Vermont
 1893 - Bradford Academy, 172 N Main St, Bradford, Vermont
 1893 - Debevoise Hall, Vermont Law School, South Royalton, Vermont
 1893 - Plymouth Congregational Church (Remodeling), 4 Post Office Sq, Plymouth, New Hampshire
 Burned.
 1894 - Brownell Block, 20 Main St, Essex Junction, Vermont
 1895 - Hotel Barton, 569 Main St, Barton, Vermont
 Burned.

References

1839 births
1900 deaths
19th-century American architects
Architects from Vermont
People from Montpelier, Vermont
Burials at Green Mount Cemetery (Montpelier, Vermont)